Pashino is a rural locality in Nizhnemedveditsky Selsoviet Rural Settlement, Kursky District, Kursk Oblast, Russia. Population:

Geography 
The village is located in the Bolshaya Kuritsa River basin (a right tributary of the Seym River), 98 km from the Russia–Ukraine border, 19 km north-west of Kursk, 4 km from the selsoviet center – Verkhnyaya Medveditsa.

 Climate
Pashino has a warm-summer humid continental climate (Dfb in the Köppen climate classification).

Transport 
Pashino is located 1.5 km from the federal route  Crimea Highway (a part of the European route ), 1.5 km from the road of intermunicipal significance  ("Crimea Highway" – Dronyayevo), 15.5 km from the nearest railway halt Bukreyevka (railway line Oryol – Kursk).

The rural locality is situated 22 km from Kursk Vostochny Airport, 142 km from Belgorod International Airport and 218 km from Voronezh Peter the Great Airport.

References

Notes

Sources

Rural localities in Kursky District, Kursk Oblast